Scindia dynasty (anglicized from Shinde) was a Hindu Maratha dynasty that ruled the erstwhile Gwalior State in central India. It had the patil-ship of Kumberkerrab in Wai and was founded by Ranoji Scindia, who started as a personal servant of the Peshwa Bajirao I. Ranoji and his descendents, along with their rivals the Holkars, played  a leading role during the Maratha ascendency in northern India in the 18th-century. The Gwalior State became a princely state under the British Raj during the 19th and the 20th-centuries. After India's independence in 1947 and the abolition of princely states, several members of the Scindia family went on to enter Indian politics.

Foundation

The Scindia dynasty was founded by Ranoji Scindia, a Kunbi personal servant of Bajirao I Peshwa. Ranoji prospered early under Bajirao because of the favorable circumstances created  by the appointment of Bajirao as the Peshwa at the age of twenty.This had evoked jealousy from senior officials like Anant Ram Sumant, Shripatrao Pant Pratinidhi, Khanderao Dabhade and Kanhoji Bhosle.This led Baji Rao to promote as commanders of his troops, talented young men who were barely out of teens such as Malhar Rao Holkar, the Pawar brothers, Pilaji Jadhav, Fateh Singh Bhosle and of course, Ranoji.None of these men  belonged to families that held hereditary Deshmukhi rights under earlier rulers such as the Deccan Sultanates. The Shindes or Scindias had served as shiledars (cavalrymen) under the Bahmani Sultanate and played an important role in the state of affairs and held Patilki of Kumberkerrab.

There are otherwise several anecdotes about the origin of the Scindhias, especially  those recorded by Sir John Malcolm. Stewart Gordon states the cultivator, etc. origin of other Marathas.

History

Maratha Period

The Scindia dynasty was founded by Ranoji Scindia, who was the son of Jankojirao Scindia, the Patil of Kanherkhed, a village in Satara District, Maharashtra. Peshwa Baji Rao's career saw the strengthening of the Maratha Empire. Ranoji was in charge of the Maratha conquests in Malwa in 1726. Ranoji established his capital at Ujjain in 1731. His successors included Jayajirao, Jyotibarao, Dattajirao, Jankojirao, Mahadji Shinde and Daulatrao Scindia.The Scindias became a major regional power in the latter half of the 18th century, and figured prominently in the three Anglo-Maratha Wars.They held sway over many of the Rajput states, and conquered north India. In 1818, after accepting the terms of a subsidiary alliance with the British, the family shifted their base from Ujjain to  The Gwalior.

Rulers of Gwalior state under the British
After the defeat of the allied Maratha states by the British in the Third Anglo-Maratha War of 1818, Daulatrao Shinde was forced to accept local autonomy as a princely state within British-occupied India and to give up Ajmer to the British. After the death of Daulatrao, Maharani Baiza Bai ruled the empire, saving it from the British power, till the adopted child Jankoji Rao took over the charge. Jankoji died in 1843, and his widow Tarabai Raje Scindia successfully maintained the position and adopted a child from close lineage named Jayajirao.

Accession of Gwalior state into Independent India
The Scindia family ruled Gwalior until India's independence from the United Kingdom in 1947, when the Maharaja Jivajirao Scindia acceded to the Government of India. Gwalior was merged with a number of other princely states to become the new Indian state of Madhya Bharat. Jiwajirao Scindia served as the state's rajpramukh, or appointed governor, from 28 May 1948 to 31 October 1956, when Madhya Bharat was merged into Madhya Pradesh.

Political careers of family members
In 1962, Vijayraje Scindia, the widow of Maharaja Jiwajirao, was elected to the Lok Sabha, beginning the family's career in electoral politics. She was first a member of the Congress Party, and later became an influential member of the Bharatiya Janata Party. Her son Madhavrao Scindia was elected to the Lok Sabha in 1971 representing the Jansangh Party, he joined Congress in 1980 and served until his death in 2001. His son, Jyotiraditya Scindia, joined the Congress Party and was elected to the seat formerly held by his father in 2004. He later joined the Bharatiya Janata Party on 11 March 2020.

Vijayaraje's daughters have supported the Bharatiya Janata Party. Vasundhara Raje Scindia contested and won five parliamentary elections from Madhya Pradesh and Rajasthan. Under the Vajpayee government from 1998 onwards, Vasundhara was in charge of several different ministries. In 2003 she led the Bharatiya Janata Party to its largest majority in Rajasthan, and became the state's Chief Minister. In 2013 again, she led Bharatiya Janata Party to a thumping win in the state of Rajasthan, winning over 160 out of the 200 seats in the assembly elections. Her other daughter, Yashodhara Raje Scindia, contested assembly elections from Shivpuri in Madhya Pradesh and won in 1998, 2003 and 2013 and also lok sabha 2004, 2009 from Gwalior. Upon the BJP's win in the state, she became the state's Minister for Tourism, Sports and Youth Affairs. Vasundhara's son Dushyant Singh entered the Lok Sabha in 2004 from Rajasthan.

Shinde Maharajas of Ujjain and Gwalior

Ranoji Rao Shinde (1731 – 19 July 1745). Died 19 July 1745.
Jayappa Rao Shinde (1745 – 25 July 1755). Born c. 1720, died 25 July 1755.
Jankoji Rao Scindia I (25 July 1755 – 15 January 1761). Born in 1745. died 15 January 1761.
 Dattaji Rao Scindia (Regent 1755 – 10 January 1760). Died 10 January 1760.
 Vacant 15 January 1761 – 25 November 1763
Kadarji Rao Scindia (25 November 1763 – 10 July 1764) Died ?.
Manaji Rao Scindia (10 July 1764 – 18 January 1768) Died ?.
Mahadaji Scindia (18 January 1768 – 12 February 1794). Born 3 December 1730, died 12 February 1794.
Daulat Rao Shinde (12 February 1794 – 21 March 1827). Born 1779, died 21 March 1827.
Jankoji Rao Scindia II (18 June 1827 – 7 February 1843). Born 1805, died 7 February 1843.
Jayaji Rao Scindia (7 February 1843 – 20 June 1886). Born 19 January 1835, died 20 June 1886.
Madho Rao Scindia (20 June 1886 – 5 June 1925). Born 20 October 1876, died 5 June 1925.
Jivajirao Scindia (Maharaja 5 June 1925 – 15 August 1947, Rajpramukh 28 May 1948 – 31 October 1956. Last Maharaja, later Rajpramukh) Born 26 June 1916, died 16 July 1961.
Madhavrao Scindia (1961–1971) The last Maharaja, before the abolishment of monarchy in 1971.

References

Further reading

External links

 
Dynasties of India
Indian surnames
Maratha clans
Hindu dynasties